Turrisipho moebii is a species of sea snail, a marine gastropod mollusk in the family Colidae, the true whelks abd the like.

Description
The length of the shell attains 50 mm.

Distribution
This marine species occurs off Iceland

References

 Dunker, W.; Metzger, A. (1875). Zoologische Ergebnisse der Nordseefahrt. VIII. Mollusca. Jahresbericht der Commission für Untersuchung der Deutschen Meere. 3: 229-264

External links
 Sars, G.O. (1878). Bidrag til Kundskaben om Norges arktiske Fauna. I. Mollusca Regionis Arcticae Norvegiae. Oversigt over de i Norges arktiske Region Forekommende Bløddyr. Brøgger, Christiania. xiii + 466 pp., pls 1-34 & I-XVIII
  Gofas, S.; Le Renard, J.; Bouchet, P. (2001). Mollusca. in: Costello, M.J. et al. (eds), European Register of Marine Species: a check-list of the marine species in Europe and a bibliography of guides to their identification. Patrimoines Naturels. 50: 180-213

Colidae
Gastropods described in 1874